General Sir Robert Onesiphorus Bright  (7 July 1823 – 15 November 1896) was a British Army officer.

He was born the son of Robert Bright and the brother of colonial businessman Charles Edward Bright and the MP Richard Bright.

He was educated at Winchester School and joined the 19th (The 1st Yorkshire North Riding) Regiment of Foot in 1843. He served in Bulgaria in 1854 and commanded the 2nd Brigade of the Light Division during the Crimean War. Promoted brigadier-general, he commanded the 1st Brigade Hazara Field Force during the Black Mountain Campaign of 1868 and commanded the Khyber Line Field Force during the 2nd Afghan War of 1878–80.

He was awarded CB in 1881 and elevated to GCB in 1894. He was given the colonelcy of The Princess of Wales's Own (Yorkshire Regiment) from 1886 to his death  and promoted full general on 1 April 1887.

Bright was a noted cricketer and all-round sportsman and ran a pack of foxhounds named "The Green Howards".

Death

He died in 1896 at his home in Guildford, Surrey, and was buried in St Mark's Church, Wyke, Surrey. He had married Catherine Miles, the daughter of Sir William Miles, 1st Baronet, and had three sons and five daughters.

References

 

1823 births
1896 deaths
People educated at Winchester College
British Army generals
Knights Grand Cross of the Order of the Bath
Green Howards officers
British Army personnel of the Crimean War
British military personnel of the Second Anglo-Afghan War